Callambulyx amanda is a species of moth of the  family Sphingidae. It is known from Burma, Thailand, Malaysia, Sumatra, Borneo and the Philippines.

It is similar to Callambulyx rubricosa, but can be distinguished by the conspicuous black marking near the tornus of the hindwing upperside.

References

Callambulyx
Moths described in 1903